Marcelo Hugo Tinelli (born 1 April 1960) is an Argentine television host, media producer and businessman, best known as the host of the TV show Showmatch broadcast on Argentina's El Trece. 

One of the most famous supporters of Club San Lorenzo de Almagro, in 2019 Tinelli became president of the club after winning the election by more than 80% of the vote. Since March 2020, Tinelli is also president of Liga Profesional de Fútbol, the association that rules and organises Primera División championships.

Career

Beginning
Tinelli was working on Radio Rivadavia as football sportscaster before Juan Alberto Badía brought him to TV to Badía y Compañía in 1983. In 1990, after several years as sports commentator, he created the light-content Videomatch, based on sport results, easy jokes, hidden cameras and bloopers.

Afterwards, he hosted the variety-musical show Ritmo de la Noche which featured live performances of international acts including Bon Jovi, Poison, Duran Duran and former Queen member Brian May. Around 1996 the program left the lightest contents and included musical shows and guests. In 1999 he received the Golden Martín Fierro Award for Videomatch. The show still airs, as Showmatch. 

He created the TV production company Ideas del Sur (Ideas from the South), which has produced many TV shows including Okupas, Buenos Vecinos, Tumberos, Fugitivos and Los Roldán. He also bought Radio Uno FM station, and the Spanish Segunda División football club CD Badajoz. 

In 2002, he helped found the volleyball team Club Ciudad de Bolívar, based in his native San Carlos de Bolívar. The team became one of the most successful of the Argentine league.

Videomatch/ShowMatch
He became popular as the presenter of Videomatch on the Argentine network Telefe. The variety show had sketches, musical guests, contests, and introduced bloopers to the Argentine audience.

Tinelli caused controversy in 2005, when he announced plans to switch to Canal 9, the third highest rated network. His show increased the average audience of Canal 9 by giving the network the highest-rated show in the country. 

In 2006 Tinelli announced a switch to El Trece, Telefe's largest competitor. Tinelli works at El Trece since then, and also produces TV dramas with his own production company, Ideas del Sur. The show title changed from Videomatch to Showmatch since the Videomatch name was owned by Telefe. Showmatch is also the name of a short-lived version of Videomatch that aired in Spain. 

ShowMatch included many segments of contests with stage acts, such as dancing or singing. In 2009 it included a segment called Gran Cuñado (Big Brother-in-Law) with parodies of Argentine politicians, that generated great stir in real political world.

Personal life

Tinelli married his first wife, Soledad Aquino, in 1986. The couple had two children: Micaela in (born in 1988), and Lelé (born in 1990). The couple divorced in 1993. Following his divorce, in 1997 he married for the second time with Paula Robles. They met at one of the shows he hosted (Ritmo de la noche). The couple lasted 12 years, during that period of time they had two children. The couple divorced in 2009. In April 2014, Tinelli had his fifth child with Guillermina Valdes.

Filmography

TV series

Television

References

External links

 Tinelli's TV history  (archive)

1960 births
Living people
Argentine television personalities
Argentine businesspeople
People from Buenos Aires Province
Golden Martín Fierro Award winners
San Lorenzo de Almagro
Argentine football chairmen and investors